Rock On! is an album by Australian Rock & Roll singers Barry Stanton and Johnny Rebb.

Track listing
Barry Stanton
 "Beggin' On My Knees"
 "Don't You Worry 'Bout That"
 "Solitary Confinement"
 "Indeed I Do"
 "A Teenage Idol"
 "Don't Let Go"
 "I Got A Woman"
 "Back In Your Arms"
 "You Are Gone"
 "For Now And Always"
 "Little Miss Heartbreak"
 "You'll Never Learn, Will Yer?"

Johnny Rebb
 "Rebel Rock"
 "Hey Sheriff"
 "Rock On"
 "Walk The Be-Bop Walk"
 "Say Yeah"
 "Highway Of Love"
 "Pathway To Paradise"
 "Ring A Rockin'"
 "The Lone Ranger Got Married"
 "L-O-V-E-V-I-LL-E"
 "Ain't I'm A Dog"
 "You Can't Judge A Book By The Cover

1981 albums
Barry Stanton albums